Dušan Pitoňák (born  in Poprad) is a Slovak wheelchair curler.

He participated at the 2014 and 2018 Winter Paralympics where Slovak team finished on sixth and ninth places respectively.

Wheelchair curling teams and events

References

External links 

Profile at the 2014 Winter Paralympics site (web archive)
Profile at the 2018 Winter Paralympics site
 Video: 

Living people
1965 births
Sportspeople from Poprad
Slovak male curlers
Slovak wheelchair curlers
Paralympic wheelchair curlers of Slovakia
Wheelchair curlers at the 2014 Winter Paralympics
Wheelchair curlers at the 2018 Winter Paralympics
Wheelchair curlers at the 2022 Winter Paralympics